Gina Stechert (born 20 November 1987 in Oberstdorf) is a German alpine skier whose best discipline is the combined. She represented Germany at the 2010 Winter Olympics.

References

1987 births
Living people
People from Oberstdorf
Sportspeople from Swabia (Bavaria)
German female alpine skiers
Alpine skiers at the 2010 Winter Olympics
Olympic alpine skiers of Germany
21st-century German women